Fax was an Argentine talk show, hosted by Nicolás Repetto, that aired from 1991 to 1992. It received two Martín Fierro Awards for best host and best production, and the first Golden Martín Fierro Award.

Golden Martín Fierro Award winners
Argentine television talk shows
El Trece original programming
1991 Argentine television series debuts
1992 Argentine television series endings